Keselowski Motorsports, formerly known as K-Automotive Racing and Brian Keselowski Motorsports, is a stock car racing team in the NASCAR Sprint Cup Series. K-Automotive previously raced in ARCA and the Nationwide Series. K-Automotive is owned and operated by Bob, Brian and Kay Keselowski. Brian Keselowski Motorsports is owned and operated by Brian Keselowski.

The team began racing in ARCA and USAC Series in the 1969 with Ron driving and Bob serving as the team's crew chief.

Winston Cup Series 
K Automotive made its debut in the NASCAR Grand National Series in 1969, the team being owned by John Keselowski. Fielding the number 62 Kaye Engineering Dodge, Homer Newland finished 36th in the team's debut at Michigan International Speedway. Newland also ran K Automotive's car at the inaugural event at Alabama International Motor Speedway, starting eighth, but dropping to twenty-seventh due to an engine failure.

In 1970, Ron began running most of the races for the team. He ran seventeen races, finishing eighth at the West Virginia 300, and finished 39th in the final points standings. They also fielded a car for Dave Marcis at the Southern 500, finishing 29th. In 1971, K fielded entries for a variety of drivers, including Ron, Dick Polling, and Bill Shirley. After taking the following year off, K returned in 1973, fielding a car for Ron in two races. He finished fifth at Michigan International Speedway. They made one start in 1974 with Bob Whitlow before making their final Cup start at the 1975 Daytona 500 when Jim Vandiver finished 35th after a wreck.

Local racing and ARCA Racing Series 
In 1975, Bob and Ron switched roles, with Bob becoming the team's driver and Ron the crew chief. Bob made his late model debut at Toledo Speedway and moved to full-time USAC racing in 1976, running 1974 Dodge Challengers and Aspens, garnering a best finish of seventh in competition. In 1978, he also ran some NASCAR Late Model Sportsman races in addition to the USAC series. He continued to run USAC and the NASCAR Grand American Series over the next several years, and won the 1983 track championship at Toledo.

In 1986, Bob Keselowski began running the ARCA series in the number 29 Chevrolet, making seven starts and getting two second-place finishes before winning his first race at Berlin Raceway. He continued to win many races and awards through the next several years, and was the 1989 ARCA Supercar champion. That same year, Chrysler re-entered auto racing, starting with the ARCA series. K was selected as one of the teams, and Mopar Performance sponsored Keselowski's number 29 Chrysler LeBaron throughout the 1990 season. Together, they won the season-opener at Daytona and finished 3rd in points. Keselowski would continue to compete in the ARCA series until the end of the 1994 season.

Ten years later, the Keselowskis returned to the series to field the number 29 Competition Graphics Dodge under a partnership with Bob Ducharme. Brian Keselowski drove seven races and had a top-ten in his debut at Kentucky Speedway along with two other top-tens. Despite failing to qualify twice in 2005, he had a string of five consecutive top-ten finishes out of seven starts. In 2006, he won his first career race at Berlin with Holloway Motorsports sponsoring and finished 29th in points. He followed that up with additional wins in the 29 in 2007. That year Mike Ciochetti drove at Talladega but wrecked and finished 39th. In addition, they expanded to a second car, the number 00 Orchard Chrysler Dodge Jeep Dodge owned by Brad Keselowski with Robb Brent. Brent ran two seasons in limited schedules and had five top-tens in sixteen starts.

In 2009, K returned to ARCA with the number 29 Chevrolet and hired Mikey Kile and Chad Finley to drive on a part-time basis. Kile had four top-ten finishes in the Greased Lightning Cleaning Products Chevy, and Finley had three in the Auto Value Chevy. Jesse Smith drove the season opener at Daytona in 2010.

Craftsman Truck Series

Truck No. 29 history
K returned to NASCAR in 1995 with the formation of the SuperTruck Series by Craftsman. Bob began driving the team's number 29 Winnebago Industries Dodge Ram, starting sixteen races and finishing in the top-ten four times, earning him a fourteenth-place points finish. He dropped to sixteenth in the standings the next year when he posted just one top-ten. In 1997, he finished a career-best fourteenth in the standings and won his only truck race at Richmond International Raceway in the Mopar Dodge. During the 1998 season, Keselowski was injured and was replaced by Dennis Setzer. Over a span of five races, Setzer had two eighth-place finishes. Keselowski returned and finished tenth at Heartland Park Topeka before handing the driving chores back to Setzer for the rest of the season. Setzer then won his first career race at Mesa Marin Raceway. In 1999, K created a second truck, the number 1, for Setzer to drive while Keselowski drove the number 29 part-time, doing research and development for Dodge. Keselowski ran five races and had a top-ten finish at Texas Motor Speedway before he retired. Setzer won three times and lost the championship by 108 points.

In 2000, Setzer won one race at Nazareth Speedway and fell to seventh in the standings. Terry Cook drove the number 29 in a one-race deal at the season finale at California Speedway and finished seventh. When Setzer left, the team switched to the number 29 and Ford. Cook joined the team full-time with sponsorship from Power Stroke Diesel. In his first year with the team, Cook won the pole at Nazareth and finished tenth in the standings. In 2002, he won four races and two poles but dropped to ninth in the final points. After he did not win again in 2003, he and PSD left the team.

The team began 2004 with Frank Kimmel driving. He finished eighth at Daytona before Brad Keselowski began driving. He made eight races, his best finish sixteenth at Mansfield before Deborah Renshaw finished out the season. Her best finish came at Martinsville Speedway, where she finished fifteenth. Brad became the team's full-time driver in 2005 with SUBcrews.com/Samson Stone as primary sponsors. He had a seventh-place finish at Daytona and finished 21st in points. Due to a lack of sponsorship, the team only ran the first two races of the season before suspending operations. While they did not attempt a race for the rest of the year, they loaned their owner's points to Morgan-Dollar Motorsports and partnered with MB Motorsports to run the O'Reilly Auto Parts 200 that season with Brad driving. He finished 34th after an engine failure.

Nationwide Series

Car No. 26 history
Beginning in the 2007 season, the team partnered with Holloway Motorsports to field entries in the Nationwide Series. They ran one race as the number 19 and then as the number 49 for three more races with Brian Keselowski driving, with a top-ten finish at Memphis Motorsports Park. After he drove briefly for Jay Robinson Racing, Keselowski moved to the team's number 92 Dodge to drive on a part-time schedule.

In 2009, the team changed numbers from number 92 to number 26 for their main car, and began to run full-time with limited sponsorship from Fischer Honda and Dusty's Collisions. Brian drove most of the races early on in the year with not a lot of luck with his best finish being 14th at Talladega. Later in the year Michael McDowell took over the ride. He drove to an 8th-place finish in Iowa as well as a 10th at Bristol. After one off starts with Danny O'Quinn and Dennis Setzer, Kevin Conway leased the team's owner points for the rest of the year and ran the ExtenZe car with a best finish of 20th.

Car No. 92 history
The 92 car debuted in 2009 at Michigan with Willie Allen driving.  He and Setzer made a total of seven starts in the car that season, but neither finished a race. Johnny Chapman began the 2010 season as driver, but after only qualifying for one race, he was replaced by Setzer, with Brian and Andy Ponstein occasionally filling. The number 92 is a start and park entry to help fund the number 26. However, the 92 ran Talladega in 2010 in its entire 312 miles (plus 7.98 miles more due to a Green-white-checkered finish), and finished 17th, after getting in the catch-fence on the last lap and catching fire.

Car No. 96 history

The 96 car also debuted in the 2009 season, but in the second race of the season. Setzer drove for the first three starts, followed by Brian Keselowski and Willie Allen. Eventually Michael McDowell would become the driver of the car with AT&T and The Real Yellow Pages sponsoring, getting an eleventh-place finish at Montreal. Setzer was expected to drive the car for most of 2010 before the team closed and merged with the number 92. Dennis Setzer ran the number 96 in Homestead.

Sprint Cup Series

Car No. 92 history
K-Automotive motorsports returned to the Cup Series in 2010 with the number 92 Dodge. The team attempted the Daytona 500 with Mike Wallace and four races with Brian Keselowski, but the team did not qualify for any of the events. The team also raced in the Sprint Showdown at Charlotte Motor Speedway with Robert Richardson Jr. driving and sponsorship provided by The Grill Topper.

In 2011, K-Automotive shut down their Nationwide team and moved up to Cup full-time. Keselowski qualified for the Daytona 500 after he raced his way from the slowest of the 48 cars who attempted the race to finishing fifth in his qualifying race, giving him the 12th starting position for the 500. Offers also started pouring in from Ray Evernham, Roger Penske, and Golden Corral. Discount Tire later sponsored the number 92. The team finished 41st after a crash and did not qualify for the next two races. In March, Keselowski had his gall bladder removed, so Dennis Setzer took over the car for Keselowski in Bristol and qualified for Bristol and finished 38th after engine trouble. The team then entered with Setzer in Martinsville, but was forced to withdraw after a crash in practice when the cars brakes failed and they did not have a backup car. K-Automotive then scaled down to a partial schedule because they only had one car. They announced a switch to Chevrolet prior to the Michigan race in June and attempted the race with sponsorship from Melling but failed to make the race. Dennis Setzer attempted New Hampshire and the fall Martinsville race but did not qualify. Scott Riggs attempted Homestead but did not qualify that as well.

In 2013, Keselowski changed the number to 52, as he was using owners points from Hamilton Means Racing to run a limited schedule. Keselowski attempted the 2013 Daytona 500, but failed to make the race. He ran Richmond and finished 40th. Later in the season, 71-year-old Morgan Shepherd ran at Loudon, at the time the oldest driver to start a race.  Keselowski would return to the car at Watkins Glen, finishing 39th after starting 43rd.

At Sonoma, BKM lent their owner points to Go Green Racing, who fielded rookie Paulie Harraka.  This entry was unrelated to BKM's entries.

In 2014, Keselowski changed the number back to 92 and the team switched to Ford, purchasing a car from Germain Racing, who had switched to Chevy. However, the team never entered a race due to lack of sponsorship.

See also 
Brad Keselowski Racing

References

External links 
Team Keselowski
Brian Keselowski Owner Stats
Bob Keselowski Owner Stats
John Keselowski Owner Stats
Ron Keselowski Owner Stats
Dusty Whitney Owner Stats

American auto racing teams
Companies based in North Carolina
NASCAR teams
ARCA Menards Series teams